Dakotamys is a genus of extinct mammal that lived during the Upper Cretaceous. It shared the world with dinosaurs. This small creature was a member of the also extinct order Multituberculata within the suborder Cimolodonta and was a member of the Paracimexomys group.

The genus Dakotamys ("Dakota mouse") was named by Eaton J.G. in 1995. Dakota refers to the Dakota Formation. "Paracimexomys and Dakotamys... resemble the Eobaataridae in the structure of the upper and lower molars, with cusps showing a tendency to coalesce, and with ornamentation of grooves and ribs on the molars," (Kielan-Jaworowska & Hurum, 2001, p. 403).

References 
 Eaton (1995), "Cenomanian and Turonian (Early Late Cretaceous) multituberculate mammals from southwestern Utah". Journal of Vert Paleo 15(4), p. 761-784.
 Kielan-Jaworowska Z & Hurum JH (2001), "Phylogeny and Systematics of multituberculate mammals". Paleontology 44, p. 389-429.

Late Cretaceous mammals of North America
Cimolodonts
Fossils of the United States
Fossil taxa described in 1995
Prehistoric mammal genera